The Tunnel to Towers Foundation is a charitable organization founded in tribute to New York Fire Department firefighter Stephen Siller, who died on September 11, 2001 during the September 11 attacks. The foundation operates as a tax-exempt 501(c)(3) non-profit organization.

See also
 2023 Hula Bowl, sponsored by the foundation

References

Further reading 

2001 establishments in New York City
501(c)(3) organizations
Advocacy groups in the United States
Charities based in New York City
Non-profit organizations based in New York City
Organizations established in 2001
United States military support organizations
Wounded and disabled military veterans topics